Can I Live may refer to:
"Can I Live?", a 2001 song by Sisqó from the album Return of Dragon
"Can I Live", a 1996 song by Jay-Z from the album Reasonable Doubt
"Can I Live", a 2005 song by Nick Cannon
"Can I Live", a 2000 song by Black Rob from the album Life Story
"Can I Live", a 2018 song by Trina from the album Trina